Motutere / Castle Rock is a  mountain  south-east of Coromandel, Waikato, New Zealand. It was used for rock climbing, with a number of high bolted routes.

Geography

The mountain is a volcanic plug made from remnants of solidified magma, the softer surrounding rock having been eroded away.

Māori exploration
Motutere means "floating island" a name bestowed by Ruamano, a descendant of Tama-te-kapua. Māori explorers of the area tended to travel along the hill ridges, so avoiding the thick vegetation in the sheltered valleys. Once dusk came they would seek shelter in order to avoid the patupaiarehe who they believed inhabited these hills. The summit of Motutere would be eschewed after dark for this reason.

In 2018, the name of the peak was officially gazetted as Motutere / Castle Rock, to incorporate its original Māori name.

Climbing
, there are 17 different ascents for rock climbers to attempt at the summit of Castle Rock. Access is via a forestry track that leaves the 309 Road near the Waiau Waterworks visitor centre and involves a 25–40 minute walk in. The track is also suitable for cycling and at the top ridge there are fine views of Great Mercury Island, Cuvier Island, Great Barrier Island and the Firth of Thames. In 2018, two deaths lead iwi to place an indefinite rāhui on the crag.

Notes

References

Mountains of Waikato
Thames-Coromandel District
Rock formations of Waikato
Volcanic plugs of New Zealand